Adrian Moss may refer to:

 Adrian Moss (basketball, born 1981), American basketball player
 Adrian Moss (basketball, born 1988), American basketball player